The 2019 J3 League, referred to as the  for sponsorship reasons, is the 6th season of J3 League under its current name.

2019 season Clubs

2018 season saw two teams promoted to J2 League: FC Ryukyu won the championship by nine points over second-placed Kagoshima United FC, which confirmed their promotion to the 2019 J2 League season with still one game to play. From second division, there was a double automatic relegation for the first time: Kamatamare Sanuki are back to third tier after five seasons, but they were promoted in 2013 from Japan Football League, when J3 League was planned. The same goes for Roasso Kumamoto, who are back in the third level of Japanese football after more than a decade.

Also, Japan Football League saw the promotion of Vanraure Hachinohe, who came third in JFL and they booked their first professional season in their history.

Personnel and kits

League table

Positions by round

Top scorers
.

Attendances

References

J3 League seasons
3